Datuk K. Rajagobal (Rajagobal Krishnasamy, Tamil: கி.ராஜகோபால்; born 10 July 1956) is a Malaysian football manager and former player. He is the former head coach for Malaysia national football team and the under-23 football team.

Rajagopal has also appeared as a football pundit for Malaysian satellite television network Astro, including the first episode in August 2009 of the FourFourTwo TV Show.

Career

As manager

Beginnings as coach 
Rajagopal started his coaching career in 1990 with PKNS F.C. He also had stints as club coach with Selangor FA and Kelantan FA.

Malaysia 
He was appointed coach for the young Malaysia U-20 team from 2004 until 2006; and the Malaysia under-19 (known as Harimau Muda A) in 2007 to 2009. Under his guidance, Harimau Muda A became the Premier League champion in 2009. Since July 2009, he is the head coach for both the Harimau Muda and Malaysia senior team, taking over from B. Sathianathan. His first games was a 3–0 win against Singapore and 5–0 win against Zimbabwe.

Rajagopal is best known for guiding Malaysia's under-23 side to its first gold medal in 20 years at the 2009 Southeast Asian Games in Laos where the team defeated Vietnam 1–0 in the final on 17 December after earlier knocking out 8-time defending champions, Thailand in the group stage. After the victory, Rajagopal earned the nickname "King Gopal". In July 2009, Rajagopal coached Malaysia in two games against English champions, Manchester United, lost in both matches 0–1 and 2–3.

He also led the national football team to win the 2010 AFF Suzuki Cup, the first time Malaysia won the championship since its inception in 1996. His philosophy of changing the tactical approach from a defensive to offensive playing style has been rewarded in this victory. His young team has shown a high standard of football possession, good defensive structure and clinical finish en route to clinch the title. His contract was not renewed at the end of 2013. Despite some rumours citing him to be appointed as the head coach for the Vietnam national football team, it does not come to fruition.

Sarawak 
In a press conference in September 2015, it was announced that Rajagopal has been appointed as head coach of Sarawak FA, beginning from December 2015. His contract was terminated the following year on 7 May 2016 after the poor performances shown by the team by finishing at the bottom of the league.

Return to PKNS F.C. 
Rajagopal was announced as the new head coach of PKNS F.C. on 22 November 2017.

Brunei

On 1 December 2020, Rajagobal was announced by the National Football Association of Brunei Darussalam to be the head coach for the Brunei national football team on a two-year contract. In January 2022, he left his post without ever taking charge of a single international match for Brunei due to the COVID-19 pandemic.

Awards and recognition

Personal Honours 
Honour of Malaysia
  :
  Commander of the Order of Meritorious Service (PJN) - Datuk (2011)

On 4 June 2011, K. Rajagopal was awarded the Panglima Jasa Negara (PJN) which carries the title Datuk in conjunction with the Yang di-Pertuan Agong's birthday in that year. He was among 67 recipients of the awards from His Majesty Tuanku Mizan Zainal Abidin at Balairong Seri, Istana Negara.

Honours as manager 
Malaysia
ASEAN Football Championship: 2010
SEA Games Gold medals: 2009

References 

1956 births
Living people
Malaysian footballers
Malaysian football managers
Malaysian people of Tamil descent
Malaysian sportspeople of Indian descent
Sportspeople from Kuala Lumpur
Malaysian Hindus
PKNS F.C. players
Selangor FA players
Association football forwards
Brunei national football team managers
Malaysia national football team managers
Malaysian expatriate sportspeople in Brunei
Expatriate football managers in Brunei
Malaysian expatriate football managers
Sarawak FA managers
Commanders of the Order of Meritorious Service